Panagiotis "Panny" Nikas (born 27 July 1988) is a former Australian footballer.

Club career

Penrith Nepean United
Whilst at the club during 2008, Nikas played 13 games scoring 3 goals.

Sutherland Sharks
In 2009, he signed a contract with Sutherland Sharks. Playing 25 games and scoring 14 times. 
Whilst playing for the Sutherland Sharks, Nikas was selected in the TeleChoice 2009 NSW Premier League season All-Star team.

Central Coast Mariners
He signed a contract with Central Coast Mariners in 2009–2010. Most of the year he had been playing in the National Youth League. Nikas made his first team debut for the Central Coast Mariners coming on as a substitute for Nicky Travis in a 2–0 home defeat to the Wellington Phoenix on 31 December 2009. Nikas was named the National Youth League 2009/10 Player of the Season.

On 23 March 2010, despite his impressive performances in their NYL side, Nikas was released by the Mariners.

Sutherland Sharks Return
In 2010 after being released by Central Coast Mariners he returned to the Sutherland Sharks playing 9 times and scoring 4 goals. He returned to the A-league after his stint with the club.

North Queensland Fury
In July, 2010, Nikas signed with Australian A-League club North Queensland Fury. He made his club debut in a 2–3 loss against Melbourne Heart.

Back to Sutherland
With the demise of North Queensland Fury, Nikas returned to his state league club Sutherland Sharks for the 2011 NSW Premier League season.

In 2015, Nikas signed with NPL NSW powerhouse Sydney United 58 FC. Nikas scored eight league goals in 19 games as United finished 7th in the league. Nikas also scored a brace in the 2015 FFA Cup Round of 32, as his side beat South Hobart FC on penalties. The following season, Nikas scored an incredible 18 league goals from midfield as Sydney United 58 took out the premiership.

A-League career statistics
(Correct as of 16 February 2011)

Honours
With Sutherland Sharks:
 NSW Premier League: 2009
With Central Coast Mariners Youth:
 National Youth League 2009/10 Player of the Season.With Sydney United 58:'''
 National Premier Leagues: 2016
 Waratah Cup: 2015; 2016

References

External links
 Central Coast Mariners profile

1988 births
Australian soccer players
Australian people of Greek descent
A-League Men players
Central Coast Mariners FC players
Northern Fury FC players
Sutherland Sharks FC players
Sydney United 58 FC players
Living people
National Premier Leagues players
Association football midfielders